C. lambertii may refer to:

 Callophyllis lambertii, a red algae
 Canna lambertii, a garden plant
 Connarus lambertii, a woody plant
 Cotoneaster lambertii, a plant with dimorphic shoots